Ilaignan is a 2011 Indian Tamil-language historical action film directed by Suresh Krissna, who directs his 50th film, and written by DMK Chief and the then Chief Minister of Tamil Nadu Kalaignar M. Karunanidhi, his 75th film and based on the 1906 Russian novel, The Mother, by Maxim Gorky.

Plot
Karky (Pa. Vijay) is the son of Arokkyasami (Nassar), who wants to win freedom of his people from the shipbuilding owner Rajanayagam (Suman) and his wife Sena (Namitha). Meera (Meera Jasmine) is Rajanayagam's sister. She is a very kindhearted woman who helps Karky. With Meera's help, Karky starts a war against Rajanayagam. Rajayanagam is not only cruel and stone-hearted, but also very cunning and a big fraud. He and his wife play a cunning game and cheat Karky. Karky's mother Valliammai (Khushbu) is initially reluctant to wage war against evil openly as she is afraid of bloodshed. She wanted all workers to live and not die. Rajanayagam crosses all the levels of cruelty. There is no way the situation can be handled peacefully, so Valliammai asks Karky to open a full-fledged war against evil. Then the final war starts between good and evil in which good wins over evil.

Cast

 Pa. Vijay as Karky Arokkyasamy
 Meera Jasmine as Meera Deivanayagam
 Remya Nambeesan as Ramya Chettiar
 Suman as Rajanayagam
 Namitha as Sena
 Nassar as Arokkyasami
 Vadivelu as Isaac
 Karunas as Subair
 Khushbu as Valliammai
 Sarath Babu as Deivanayagam
 Y. Gee. Mahendra as Chettiar
 Rajendran as Kaalia
 Manivannan
 Delhi Ganesh
 Nizhalgal Ravi
 Rajkapoor
 Ilavarasu
 Bala Singh
 Alex
 Thennavan
 Thyagu
 Kavithalaya Krishnan
 K. Natraj

Soundtrack

The soundtrack has 5 songs composed by Vidyasagar and lyrics written by Pa. Vijay.
 "Mazhayil Kulitha" – Karthik, Anweshaa
 "Imai Thoothane" – Chinmayi
 "Neeya Neeya" – Tippu
 "Oru Nila" – Karthik, Shreya Ghoshal
 "Thozha Vaanam" – Hariharan

Reception
Sify wrote "The film is made like an old fashioned steamy tear jerker where good triumphs over evil in the last reel. Characters and milieu look early 20th century, they speak loudly as though they are on a stage without mikes". Behindwoods wrote "Ilaingan is a movie that extols the virtues of communism; of workers demanding their rights and fighting for them. A good tight plot which seldom deviates, but is weighed down by a slightly plain graph of narration and a bit incomplete period recreation. It will be a good watch for those who enjoy strong-willed dramas." Nowrunning wrote "
Great effort has been taken to make the film with a ship of majestic proportions, but the story fails to impress. The plot is age old, something irrelevant in today's time."

References

External links
 

2011 films
2011 action drama films
Indian action drama films
2010s Tamil-language films
Films directed by Suresh Krissna
Films scored by Vidyasagar
Films based on works by Maxim Gorky
Films based on Russian novels
Films with screenplays by M. Karunanidhi